Elena Chernenko may refer to:

 Elena Chernenko (politician) (born 1957), Transnistrian politician
 Elena Chernenko (journalist), Russian journalist and antiwar activist